The Men's 50 metre butterfly competition at the 2019 World Championships was held on 21 and 22 July 2019. The defending champion Ben Proud finished 7th in the final. The winner, Caeleb Dressel, set a competition record in the final, winning in 22.35 seconds.

Records
Prior to the competition, the existing world and championship records were as follows.

The following new records were set during this competition.

Results

Heats
The heats were held on 21 July at 11:02.

Semifinals
The semifinals were held on 21 July at 20:23.

Semifinal 1

Semifinal 2

Final
The final was held on 22 July at 20:47.

References

Men's 50 metre butterfly